Cover or covers may refer to:

Packaging 
 Another name for a lid
 Cover (philately), generic term for envelope or package
 Album cover, the front of the packaging
 Book cover or magazine cover
 Book design
 Back cover copy, part of copywriting
 CD and DVD cover, CD and DVD packaging
 Smartphone cover, a mobile phone accessory that protects a mobile phone

People 
 Cover (surname)

Arts, entertainment, and media

Music

Albums 
Cover
 Cover (Tom Verlaine album), 1984
 Cover (Joan as Policewoman album), 2009
Covered
 Covered (Cold Chisel album), 2011
 Covered (Macy Gray album), 2012
 Covered (Robert Glasper album), 2015
Covers
 Covers (Beni album), 2012
 Covers (Regine Velasquez album), 2004
 Covers (Placebo album), 2003
 Covers (Show of Hands album), 2000
 Covers (James Taylor album), 2008
 Covers (Fayray album), 2005
 Covers (Deftones album), 2011
 Covers (Cat Power album), 2022
 Covers, an album by Break of Reality

Extended plays 
 Covers (A Camp EP), 2009
 Covers (Franz Ferdinand EP), 2009
 Covers (Get Cape. Wear Cape. Fly EP), 2009
 Covers (The Autumns EP), 2001
 Covers (Young Statues EP), 2012

Other uses in music
 Cover version, a new version of a previously released song
 Cover, an understudy in opera

Films
 Cover (film), a 2007 film directed by Bill Duke
 Covers (film), an upcoming comedy film directed by Nisha Ganatra

Magazines
 Cover Magazine (publication), a New York City arts monthly publication

Business 
 Cover (finance), repurchasing a short order made on the stock/equity, forex or futures markets
 Cover (law), a remedy for the breach of a contract for the receipt of goods
 Cover charge, an entry fee
 Cover (hospitality)
 Cover Corp., parent organization for VTuber idol company Hololive Production

Deception and concealment 
 Cover (telecommunications), a communications concealment technique
 Cover, something fake used in a cover-up
 Non-official cover, the identity assumed by an operative who takes a covert role in an organization without official ties to the government
 Official cover, the identity assumed by an operative who takes a position in an organization with diplomatic ties

Mathematics, science and technology 
 Cover (algebra), the concept of an algebraic structure that maps onto another structure in structure-preserving fashion
 Cover (topology), the mathematical concept of a collection of sets whose union contains each set as a subset
 Cover, a pair in the covering relation of a partially ordered set, or the greater element in such a pair
 Cover, in database theory, an equivalent set of constraints
 Land cover, physical material on the surface of the earth
 Concrete cover, in engineering, distance between reinforcement and the outer surface of element
 Sedimentary cover, in geology, overlies a basement or crystalline basement

Military
 Protection from enemy fire - see, for example, infantry tactics
 Cover or covering fire, also known as suppressive fire
 A term for any type of uniform hat:
 Campaign cover or campaign hat, a broad-brimmed felt or straw hat
 Utility cover, the United States Marine Corps cap

Sports 
 Cover (cricket), a region of the field with respect to the batsman in cricket
 To cover, a term in sports betting regarding a game's point spread

Other uses 
 Cover letter, a letter of introduction accompanying another document
 Cover, or covers, the top layer of bedding

See also 
 
 
 Slipcover, protection for a piece of upholstered furniture
 Coverage (disambiguation)
 Covering (disambiguation)
 Uncover (disambiguation)
 Uncovered (disambiguation)